Charles Mensah (born 17 May 1999) is a Ghanaian professional footballer who plays as midfielder for Ghanaian Premier League side Bechem United F.C.

Career

Early career 
Mensah started his career with Ghana Division Two League side Sampdoria Ghana in 2014. He played there for 3 years before securing a move Bechem United.

Bechem United 
Mensah joined Ghana Premier League side Bechem United F.C in 2017 and he made his debut and played 4 league matches that season. He made his debut in a 1–0 victory over International Allies on 9 April 2017. The following season, he made 3 league matches as the league cancelled due to the dissolution of the Ghana Football Association in June 2018, as a result of the Anas Number 12 Expose. During the 2019 GFA Normalization Competition, he made 12 appearances and scored 2 goals. In 2019–20 season, Mensah established himself as a key member of the club with him featuring in all 15 league matches, scored a goal and made 3 assists before the league was truncated due to the COVID-19 pandemic.

Personal life 
Mensah's role models are Ghanaian footballer Charles Taylor and Spanish footballer Andre Iniesta.

References

External links 
 
 

Living people
1999 births